John J. Palmer is the author of the self-published book, How to Brew and an active member of the homebrewing community.

Palmer began writing How to Brew in 1995. The website The Real Beer Page hosted the first edition of the book at howtobrew.com. Palmer self-published a print edition of How to Brew in 2000. The Third Edition was released in late May 2006.

How to Brew is frequently cited as the definitive authority on homebrewing

Palmer's follow-up books include Brewing Classic Styles: 80 Winning Recipes Anyone Can Brew with Jamil Zainasheff and Water: A Comprehensive Guide for Brewers with Colin Kaminski.

Palmer is from Midland, Michigan and attended Michigan Technological University. He graduated with a degree in Metallurgical Engineering in 1987. John worked in the space program at a failure analysis lab in Irvine, California, and he has helped design, build, and inspect hardware that is currently flying on the International Space Station.

Books
 How to Brew (3rd Edition),
 How to Brew (4th Edition),
 Brewing Classic Styles: 80 Winning Recipes Anyone Can Brew, 
 Water: A Comprehensive Guide for Brewers,

References

Homebrewing
Michigan Technological University alumni
People from Midland, Michigan
1965 births
Living people